The Equestrian Portrait of Philip III is a portrait of Philip III of Spain on horseback by Diego Velázquez. It was painted in 1634/35, some years after the subject's death, as part of a series of paintings of the royal family.  Intended to be displayed in the Hall of Realms, originally a wing of the Buen Retiro Palace in Madrid, it is now in the Prado Museum.

The portrait was commissioned by Philip III's son Philip IV. It was painted for the decoration of the Hall of Realms of the Buen Retiro Palace, along with the equestrian portraits of Phillip III's wife, Queen Margaret, Philip IV, Isabella of France, and Prince Baltasar Carlos. The studio of the artist is believed to have made a significant contribution to the painting.

External links
Metropolitan Museum of Art catalog for Velázquez exhibition — fully available online as PDF, containing info on this portrait (see index).

Philip
1635 paintings
Philip 03
Philip 03
Philip 03
Philip 03
Philip 03